La Yesca is a municipality and the municipal seat of the same in the Mexican state of Nayarit.  The population of the municipality was 12,025 (2005).  The population of the town and municipal seat was 356 inhabitants in 2005.  The population density was 7 inhabitants per square kilometer, one of the lowest in the state.

The name is derived from a species of porous and soft wood called "yesca", which is found in the area.

Geography
Located at the southern end of the Sierra Madre Occidental, it is mostly mountainous terrain. It lies between 21º 10’ and 22º 00’ North latitude and 103º 43” and 104º 33’ west longitude. It is bordered to the southwest by the municipalities of Santa María del Oro, Jala and Ixtlán del Río, to the northwest by the municipality of El Nayar, and to the north, east and south by the state of Jalisco.

Mountainous zones comprise 95% of the area.  The main elevations are Sierra el Pinabete at 1,420 m, the Sierra Pajaritos with an elevation of 2,500 m and the Sierra de Álica with an elevation of 2,200 m.

The rivers are: the Río Grande de Santiago, Bolaños, Camotlán, Huaynamota and Jora Viejo.

La Yesca has vast forest and mineral resources, as well as pastures for extensive cattle raising.

The soil is generally rocky, eroded and with few lands for agriculture.

Demographics
The census of 1995 registered 4,350 indigenous inhabitants, which made up 35.92% of the population. La Yesca had the second largest indigenous population in the state after El Nayar.

Economy and infrastructure
The road system is precarious and the main means of transport is by plane.

The economy is based on agriculture, which is almost all seasonal.  Most of the planted area is used for corn.  Cattle raising is the main activity of the municipality and there were more than 80,000 head in 1995.

There is at least one active mine for gold and silver located on a 6 km² concession.  The project includes two previous producing mines and a modern milling facility capable of milling 200 tonnes per day of feed. Approximately 200,000 tonnes of tailings are available to process immediately, with the tailings containing good grades of both gold and silver.

La Yesca is the main processor of pine wood in the state.  It produced 41% of the state total in 1995.

Notable residents
 Lupita Palomera  (1913–2008), Mexican singer of radio, stage, film, and television. Successful performer of Mexican bolero. Known for her recordings of "Vereda tropical", "Perfidia", "Frenesí", and "Incertidumbre", among other songs.
 Ahuizotl Sánchez (b. 1962), football player and manager

Notes and references

External links
Enciclopedia de los Muncipios de Mexico
Information about the mines
Arrest of dangerous criminal in La Yesca

Populated places in Nayarit
Municipalities of Nayarit